Clarke Chapman is a British engineering firm based in Gateshead, which was formerly listed on the London Stock Exchange.

History

The company was founded in 1864 in Gateshead by William Clarke (1831–1890). In 1865 Clarke took in a partner, Abel Chapman, and the two of them developed the business into one of the largest manufacturers of cranes and other mechanical handling equipment in the world. In 1870 two further partners joined the firm, Joseph Watson and Joseph Gurney. The firm became known as Clarke, Chapman and Gurney. Joseph Gurney retired from the firm in 1882. The firm subsequently formed a partnership with John Furneaux and Charles Parsons, and became known as Clarke, Chapman, Parsons, and Company. Parsons left the firm in 1889.

By 1907 the firm manufactured an extensive range of ship's auxiliary machinery, mining plant, water tube boilers, and pumps.  Clarke Chapman became the main supplier of auxiliary equipment to the British shipbuilding industry before the First World War.

In 1969 Clarke Chapman acquired Sir William Arrol & Co., a leading bridge-builder.

In 1970 Clarke Chapman acquired John Thompson, a leading boiler making business based in Wolverhampton.

In 1974 Clarke Chapman acquired the UK interests of International Combustion, a diverse group of heavy engineering businesses.

The company merged with Reyrolle Parsons in 1977 to form Northern Engineering Industries plc which itself was acquired by Rolls-Royce plc in 1989.

The business continues today as part of Langley Holdings Limited which acquired it from Rolls-Royce in 2000.

Ships using Clarke Chapman mechanical handling equipment include the RFA Wave Knight and the RFA Wave Ruler completed in 2000 and 2001 respectively.

Operations

The company trades under the names of Cowans Sheldon (railway cranes), RB Cranes (construction cranes), Stothert & Pitt (port cranes) and Wellman Booth (steel plant cranes).

See also

 C.A. Parsons and Company
 A. Reyrolle & Company

References

External links
 Official site
 Clarke Chapman History
 Partial list of the firm's early product literature
 
 

Boilers
Companies based in Tyne and Wear
British companies established in 1864
Engineering companies of the United Kingdom
1864 establishments in England
Manufacturing companies established in 1864